Edward Walton Pearson, Sr. (January 25, 1872 – July 4, 1946) was an African-American entrepreneur, Buffalo Soldier and Spanish–American War veteran, civil rights leader, and pioneering sports enthusiast. He moved to Asheville, North Carolina in 1906, where he became known as the "Black Mayor of West Asheville" because of his influence in African-American neighborhood development and community life.

Early life and education 
Pearson was born in 1872 in Glen Alpine, North Carolina, to Sindy and Edward Pearson, in Burke County. He completed local public school through the fourth grade. Interested in mining, he moved to Jellico, Tennessee, where he enlisted in the US Army. He served as a Buffalo Soldier (9th Cavalry Troop B) from 1893 to 1898 in Fort Robinson, Nebraska during the Spanish-American War.

After being discharged from the Army, Pearson lived in Chicago, Illinois. He supplemented his early formal education by taking correspondence courses on insurance, business, religion, and law, including courses at the Chicago Correspondence School of Law.

Business ventures 
After moving to Asheville, Pearson began development of Burton Street (then known as Pearson Park) and Park View neighborhoods, working with Rutherford Platt Hayes, who bought the land, to create African-American subdivisions. These neighborhoods continued to be predominantly African American until the late 20th century, but numerous residents were displaced because of urban renewal. He also sold real estate for development in this area as an agent on behalf of Hayes, a developer and librarian, son of President Rutherford B. Hayes.

In addition to his real estate ventures, Pearson operated a general store, organized the Mountain City Mutual Insurance Company, and ran a mail order shoe business called Piedmont Shoe Company. The general store in West Asheville served as the home base for these operations.

Agricultural fair 
Pearson's commitment to improving the lives of African Americans in Asheville xtended to recreational activities and community life. He donated Pearson Park in the Burton Street Community to the City of Asheville. In 1914, he organized the Buncombe County and District Colored Agricultural Fair there. One of the largest agricultural fairs in the Southeast, it attracted visitors of all races from all over Western North Carolina and South Carolina. Attractions included amusement park rides, games, livestock shows, and cash prize competitions in categories ranging from baked goods to flower arrangement. the Fair was held annually until 1947, a year after Pearson's death, and later revived as the Burton Street Agricultural Fair.

Baseball 
In 1916, Pearson formed the Asheville Royal Giants, Asheville's first black semi-professional baseball team. The Royal Giants played at Oates Park on Asheville's south side and sometimes at Pearson Park. Baseball was not a full-time career for his players, many of whom held jobs at Biltmore Estate, on trains, or in hotels like the Grove Park Inn, Battery Park Hotel, and the former George Vanderbilt Hotel.

In 1921, Pearson also founded and became president of the Blue Ridge Colored Baseball League.

Other organizations 
Pearson was very involved in community organizations. In 1933, he organized and was first president of the Asheville branch of the NAACP. He also served as president of the Asheville chapters of the Universal Negro Improvement Association and the North Carolina Negro Improvement Association.

Additionally, Pearson was a member of several fraternal groups, including the Odd Fellows, the Knights of Pythias, and the Freemasons. Among the latter, he was elected to the office of Grand Master.

Family 
Pearson and his family lived in a home behind the general store he operated in West Asheville. His wife was Annis (Bradshaw) Pearson. They had two daughters, Iola Pearson Byers and Annette Pearson Cotton, and one son, Edward W. Pearson Jr.

Legacy 
Pearson's legacy has been commemorated in Asheville with a community identification sign in 2008 as well as larger-than-life mural painted on the back of Burton Street Community Center in 2014 for the 100th anniversary celebration of the fair that Pearson first organized in 1914. The fair was revived in the 21st century and renamed in 2012 as the Burton Street Agricultural Fair.

References 

1872 births
1946 deaths
African-American businesspeople
African-American history of North Carolina
American military personnel of the Spanish–American War
20th-century African-American people